Achaiko (before 1928: Μπεδρόνι - Bedroni) is a village in the municipal unit of Olenia, Achaea, Greece. It is located on the left bank of the river Peiros, 2 km north of Lousika, 5 km east of Kato Achaia, and 18 km southwest of Patras. In 2011 Achaiko had a population of 192.

Population

See also
List of settlements in Achaea

References

External links
 Achaiko GTP Travel Pages

Olenia
Populated places in Achaea